Todd Jensen is an American bassist who has played for various artists, including the bands Sequel, Hardline, and Harlow, as well as David Lee Roth, Ozzy Osbourne, Steve Perry, Alice Cooper, Paul Rodgers, and Journey

Todd Jensen played with David Lee Roth in 1991 on the A Little Ain't Enough tour and several Roth tours afterwards, and with Ozzy Osbourne only very briefly, and was replaced by bassist Geezer Butler. Officially, Geezer Butler is credited for all the bass on Ozzmosis, though there have been claims that several uncredited musicians also played on the album, possibly including Todd Jensen.
For some time Todd has been David Lee Roth's personal tour manager and was on tour with Van Halen in 2015. In 2021, Todd was asked to play for Journey, while Randy Jackson recovered from back surgery. Jensen played bass for Journey on their Freedom Tour.

Discography

With Sequel
 Sequel (1982)
 Daylight Fright (1983)
 Back (2007)

With Caryl Mack 
"Caryl Mack" (1988)

With Doro 
"Doro" (1990)
"A Whiter Shade of Pale" (1995)
"World Gone Wild" (2015)

With Harlow 
Harlow (1990)

With Hardline 
Double Eclipse (1992)

With Paul Rodgers 
The Hendrix Set (1993)
Muddy Water Blues: A Tribute to Muddy Waters (1993)
Paul Rodgers In Concert - 590 (1994)
The Chronicle (1994)
Detective At Dawn (2009)

Various - Tribute To Deep Purple 
Smoke On The Water: A Tribute (1994)

With Gunshy 
Mayday (1995)

Marc Ferrari & Friends 
Guest List (1995)

With Graham Bonnet 
Underground (1997)

With Alice Cooper 
A Fistful of Alice (1997)

With Jeff Scott Soto 
Cover 2 Cover (2005)

References

Hardline (band) members
Journey (band) members
Ozzy Osbourne
The Ozzy Osbourne Band members
Alice Cooper (band) members
Year of birth missing (living people)
Living people
American bass guitarists